The Sawyer Business School is one of the three schools comprising Suffolk University in Boston, Massachusetts. Suffolk was founded in 1906; the Business School was founded in 1937 by Gleason Leonard Archer.

Academics 

Sawyer Business School offers part-time and full-time undergraduate and graduate programs. 

Undergraduate degrees are available in:

 Accounting
 Business Analytics
 Business Economics
 Corporate Accounting & Finance
 Entrepreneurship
 Finance
 Financial Wealth Management
 Global Business
 Information Systems
 Management
 Marketing

There are also 30 minors and numerous concentrations.

At the graduate level the Business School offers:

 Master of Science in Accounting 
 Master of Science in Business Analytics 
 Master of Science in Finance
 Master of Science in Healthcare Administration 
 Master of Science in Law, Life Sciences
 Master of Science in Management and Organizational Leadership 
 Master of Science in Marketing
 MBA
 Executive MBA
 Master of Science in Public Administration 
 Master of Science in Taxation

Students can also earn certificates or joint degrees among programs, as well as with the Suffolk University Law School.

The Business School features innovative courses like "Crowdfunding the Venture" through its Center for Entrepreneurship as well as a focus on global education, through, for example, its Global Travel Seminars, which give students the opportunity to learn about business around the world by visiting companies, immersing themselves in local business culture, and meeting global leaders. Destinations have included London, Brazil, Silicon Valley, China, Germany, Singapore, and Las Vegas.

The School offers robust experiential learning opportunities in Boston and around the world. In the past, students have done work with companies and organizations like iRobot, Sonos, CARE, Pandora, SiriusXM, the EU Parliament, and others. The School also places an emphasis on public service, leveraging its connections to the Massachusetts State House (which is right next to campus) and other local, state, and national entities.

Rankings & Accreditations 
The Sawyer Business School is the only business school in the United States to obtain three accreditations from the leading international accreditation agencies in the areas of Business and Accounting, Healthcare Management (CAHME), and Public Administration.

Princeton Review ranked the Sawyer Business School as one of "The Best Business Schools" for 2022,and the online MBA in the Top 50 in the nation.

CEO Magazine has ranked the MBA as a global 'Tier 1' every year since 2017.

U.S. News & World Report ranked the MPA in the Top 100 Public Affairs programs in the nation for its 2023 rankings. The program has jumped 70 spots since 2017.

See also 
Suffolk University
Suffolk University Law School
List of Suffolk University people

Notes

External links 
Sawyer Business School

Universities and colleges in Boston
Educational institutions established in 1937
Suffolk University
Business schools in Massachusetts
Beacon Hill, Boston
1937 establishments in Massachusetts